The Matiari–Lahore transmission line is a privately developed $2.1 billion transmission line under construction as part of the China–Pakistan Economic Corridor (CPEC). The line will stretch 878 kilometers from Matiari, Sindh, to Nankana Sahib District near Lahore, Pakistan, of which 550.65 kilometers will be in Punjab province, and 314.9 kilometers in Sindh Province.

It will be a 660 kilovolt High Voltage Direct Current line and will help transmit 4,000 MW of generated electricity from new coal power plants at Port Qasim, Hub, and Thar, to northern Pakistan.  Construction is expected to last 36–42 months.

It is being developed by State Grid Corporation of China, and will be built on a "Build-Own-Operate-Transfer" basis with the Chinese company handing the infrastructure over to the Government of Pakistan in 25 years. The Matiari to Lahore transmission line is to be built on an "urgent basis" by the China Electric Power Equipment and Technology Company.

See also

 List of power stations in Pakistan

References

External links
 Environmental Impact Assessment Report, by Pakistan's National Transmission and Dispatch Company Ltd.

Electric power transmission infrastructure in Pakistan
China–Pakistan Economic Corridor
2016 establishments in Pakistan
HVDC transmission lines